Medical Examination (Fishermen) Convention, 1959 is  an International Labour Organization Convention.

It was established in 1959, with the preamble stating:
Having decided upon the adoption of certain proposals with regard to the medical examination of fishermen,...

Ratifications
As of 2022, the convention has been ratified by 30 states. Of these ratifying states, five—Bosnia and Herzegovina, France, Netherlands, Norway and Poland—had denounced the treaty via an automatic process that denounces the 1959 convention when a superseding convention is ratified by the same state.

External links 
Text.
Ratifications.

International Labour Organization conventions
Treaties concluded in 1959
Treaties entered into force in 1961
Fishers
Treaties of Azerbaijan
Treaties of Belgium
Treaties of the military dictatorship in Brazil
Treaties of the People's Republic of Bulgaria
Treaties of Costa Rica
Treaties of Croatia
Treaties of Cuba
Treaties of Ecuador
Treaties of France
Treaties of West Germany
Treaties of Guinea
Treaties of Guatemala
Treaties of Kyrgyzstan
Treaties of Liberia
Treaties of Montenegro
Treaties of the Netherlands
Treaties of Norway
Treaties of Panama
Treaties of Peru
Treaties of the Polish People's Republic
Treaties of the Soviet Union
Treaties of Serbia and Montenegro
Treaties of Yugoslavia
Treaties of North Macedonia
Treaties of Slovenia
Treaties of Francoist Spain
Treaties of Tajikistan
Treaties of the Ukrainian Soviet Socialist Republic
Treaties of Tunisia
Treaties of Uruguay
Admiralty law treaties
Treaties extended to Aruba
Treaties extended to French Guiana
Treaties extended to Guadeloupe
Treaties extended to Martinique
Treaties extended to Réunion
Occupational safety and health treaties
1959 in labor relations